Bucaq (also, Budzhak) is a village and municipality in the Oghuz Rayon of Azerbaijan.  It has a population of 1,350.

References 

Populated places in Oghuz District